The men's featherweight (57 kg/125.4 lbs) Low-Kick division at the W.A.K.O. European Championships 2006 in Skopje was the third lightest of the male Low-Kick tournaments and involved only six fighters.  Each of the matches was three rounds of two minutes each and were fought under Low-Kick kickboxing rules.

Due to there not being enough men for a tournament fit for eight, two of the fighters received byes through to the semi finals.  The tournament gold medal went to Russia's Zurab Faroyan, who defeated Serb Milos Anic in the final by split decision.  It was Zurab's fourth gold medal in a row at a W.A.K.O. championships and fifth overall (Paris '03, Agadir '05, Szeged '05, Lisbon '06, Skopje '06).  Gabor Kiss from Hungary and Mariusz Cieśliński from Poland won bronze.

Results

Key

See also
List of WAKO Amateur European Championships
List of WAKO Amateur World Championships
List of male kickboxers

References

External links
 WAKO World Association of Kickboxing Organizations Official Site

W.A.K.O. European Championships 2006 (Skopje)